Pupinella masuhowaruensis is a species of pulmonate gastropod in the family Pupinidae from the mountains of Taiwan.

This species has been recorded formally only from the type locality at 1500 m a.s.l. in Masuhowaru Village, Taoyuan District, Kaohsiung County of Southern Taiwan.

References

masuhowareuensis
Gastropods described in 2004